The Dirkon is a paper camera kit that was first published in 1979 in the Communist Czechoslovakian magazine ABC mladých techniků a přírodovědců [translated as An ABC of Young Technicians and Natural Scientists]. The pattern was created by Martin Pilný, Mirek Kolár, and Richard Vyškovský.

The name Dirkon is a play on words based on the combination of the parts of two words: Dirk- is the beginning of the Czech word dírka (pinhole), and -kon is the end of the name of the well-known Japanese camera, Nikon.

See also 
Pinhole camera

External links 
Link to scans of the original kit 
A lot of information on the Dirkon

135 film cameras
Czechoslovakia